The 2023 vision is a set of goals released by the administration of Prime Minister (now President) Recep Tayyip Erdoğan in 2010 and 2011, to coincide with the centenary of the Republic of Turkey in 2023.

Elements of the 2023 vision

Economy 
Become one of the top ten world economies by 2023.
Gross domestic product of $1 trillion by 2014 (Assessment: $0.934 trillion in 2014) and of $2 trillion.
Per capita income of $25,000.
Increase annual Turkish exports to $500 billion.
Foreign trade volume of $1 trillion.
Increase the employment rate by 10 points to a working population of 30 million.
Reduce the unemployment rate to 5 percent.
Addition of income through applying duty on ocean trade through Straits of Bosphorus and Dardanelles.

Progress on economic goals

Energy 

Build 20,000 Megawatt installed capacity of wind energy and 600 Megawatt installed capacity of geothermal energy
Reduce energy consumption to 20 percent below 2010 levels through improved efficiency
Three operating nuclear power plants and those plants are expected to have an installed capacity of 14,700 Megawatt.

Foreign policy 
Turkey's foreign-policy objectives and vision as articulated by former Prime Minister Ahmet Davutoğlu:

In 2016, President Erdogan called for a referendum after Britain's decision on leaving the European Union.

Health care 
100 percent participation in health insurance systems
Raise the number of physicians per 100,000 people to 210 physicians (185 currently)

Transport 

Build 11 thousand kilometers of new railway and expand the high-speed train network
Build 15 thousand kilometers of divided highway
Grow ports to number among world's 10 largest
Domestically produced airplanes, unmanned aerial vehicles and satellite

Tourism 
Be the fifth largest tourist destination 
Host 50 million visitors
Obtain US$50 billion of tourism revenue

Progress on tourism goals

Effects on the progress of 2023 vision

2016 Turkish coup d'état attempt 

On the summer of 2016, a coup d'état was attempted in Turkey against state institutions, including the government and President Recep Tayyip Erdoğan. The attempt was carried out by a faction within the Turkish Armed Forces that organized themselves as the Peace at Home Council. They attempted to seize control of several key places in Ankara, Istanbul, and elsewhere, but failed to do so after forces loyal to the state defeated them. 

During the coup, over 300 people were killed and more than 2,100 were injured.  Many government buildings, including the Turkish Parliament and the Presidential Palace, were bombed from the air. Mass arrests followed, with at least 40,000 detained, including at least 10,000 soldiers and 2,745 judges. A significant amount of tourists cancelled their trip to Turkey.

2018 Turkish currency and debt crisis 

The Turkish currency and debt crisis of 2018 was a financial crisis in Turkey. It is characterized by a plunging value of the Turkish lira, high inflation, rising borrowing costs and corresponding loan defaults.

Under the government of Recep Tayyip Erdoğan, Turkey has been running huge and growing current account deficits, reaching $7.1 billion by January 2018, while the rolling 12-month deficit rose to $51.6 billion. By the end of 2017, the corporate foreign-currency debt pile in Turkey had more than doubled since 2009, to $214 billion after netting against their foreign-exchange assets, equal to about 40 percent of economic output, with about 80 percent held by domestic banks.

In 2018, the lira's exchange rate accelerated deterioration, reaching a level of US$4.5/TRY by mid-May. Among economists, the accelerating loss of value was generally attributed to Recep Tayyip Erdoğan preventing the Central Bank of the Republic of Turkey from making the necessary interest rate adjustments. Erdogan, who claimed interest rates beyond his control to be "the mother and father of all evil", said that "the central bank can't take this independence and set aside the signals given by the president."

COVID-19 pandemic 

The global COVID-19 pandemic triggered severe social and economic disruption around the world, including the largest global recession since the Great Depression. Governmental interventions, including travel restrictions and lockdowns, had a major effect on the economic and tourism goals.

2022 Russian invasion of Ukraine 

Turkey's economic policy has received significant setbacks as a result of Russia's invasion of Ukraine, with gasoline price rising, canceled vacation bookings and textile purchases, and worries of food shortages. In the previous years, Turkey received the most tourists from Russia.

References

External links 
 Full Text of Prime Minister Erdogan's speech
 Tourism Strategy of Turkey by Ministry of Culture and Tourism
 Industry Strategy Document by Ministry of Industry and Trade

Recep Tayyip Erdoğan
Justice and Development Party (Turkey)
2023 in politics
2010s in Turkey
Politics of Turkey
Turkey